The Hurricane River is a  river in Alger County in the Upper Peninsula of Michigan in the United States. It empties into Lake Superior in the Pictured Rocks National Lakeshore. There is a campground at the mouth of the river which is also the beginning of a trail that leads past various old shipwrecks to the historic Au Sable Lighthouse. The mouth of the river is also very near the eastern end of a stretch of relatively straight shoreline known as Twelvemile Beach.

See also
List of rivers of Michigan

References

External links

Michigan  Streamflow Data from the USGS
 Information on campgrounds in the Pictured Rocks National Lakeshore

Rivers of Michigan
Pictured Rocks National Lakeshore
Rivers of Alger County, Michigan
Tributaries of Lake Superior
Articles containing video clips